The 1946 San Francisco Seals season was the 44th season in the history of the San Francisco Seals baseball team. The team compiled a 115–68 record and won the PCL pennant. Lefty O'Doul was in his 12th season as the team's manager. Playing its home games at Seals Stadium, the Seals led the PCL in attendance with paid admissions of 670,563, an increase of more than 240,000 over the prior year.

In the Governor's Cup semi-final playoffs, the Seals swept the Hollywood Stars, four games to zero. In the finals, they defeated the Oakland Oaks, four games to two. With the victory over the Oaks, the Seals won their fourth consecutive Governor's Cup.

Pitchers
Pitcher Larry Jansen, an Oregon native, led the PCL with 30 wins, a 1.57 earned run average (ERA), an .833 winning percentage, and 31 complete games. He also tallied 171 strikeouts. Jansen joined the New York Giants in 1947 and remained with that club for eight seasons.

Cliff Melton was San Francisco's No. 2 pitcher, compiling a 17–12 record and a 2.83 ERA.

Position players
First baseman Ferris Fain, who grew up across the Bay in Oakland, California, led the PCL with 112 RBIs, compiled a .301 batting average, and led the Seals with 11 home runs and 117 runs scored. After the season, Fain was drafted by the Philadelphia Athletics.  Fain went on to play nine seasons in the majors from 1947 to 1955. 

Second baseman Hugh Luby led the team in hits with 199. Luby was one of the most durable players in PCL history. He set a PCL record playing in 866 consecutive games with the Oakland Oaks between 1939 and 1943.

Vince DiMaggio, older brother of Joe DiMaggio who played 10 years in the majors from 1937 to 1946, appeared in 43 games for the Seals.

1946 PCL standings

Statistics

Batting 
Note: Pos = Position; G = Games played; AB = At bats; H = Hits; Avg. = Batting average; HR = Home runs; RBI = Runs batted in

Pitching 
Note: G = Games pitched; IP = Innings pitched; W = Wins; L = Losses; PCT = Win percentage; ERA = Earned run average; SO = Strikeouts

References

Further reading
 "The Greatest Minor League: A History of the Pacific Coast League, 1903-1957", by Dennis Snelling (McFarland 2011)
 "San Francisco Seals", by Martin Jacobs & Jack McGuire (Arcadia Publishing 2005)

1946 in sports in California
Pacific Coast League seasons